The Race to Stop Suicide 200 presented by Place of Hope was an ARCA Menards Series East stock car race held annually at New Smyrna Speedway in New Smyrna Beach, Florida from 2014 to 2022. The race was always the season opener and took place in February on the same week or the weekend before the Daytona 500 at the nearby Daytona International Speedway.

History

The race was established in 2014 and held on the same weekend as the track's World Series of Asphalt race.

The race was originally 150 laps and 72 miles long (from 2014 to 2017), then 175 laps and 84 miles long (from 2018 to 2021), and finally 200 laps and 96 miles long in the final edition.

Winners

2015: Race extended due to a green-white-checker finish. 
2021: Race extended due to multiple green-white-checker finish attempts.

References

External links
 

2014 establishments in Florida
ARCA Menards Series East